Croton laevigatus is a plant species native to Asia.

laevigatus
Flora of Asia
Plants described in 1791